The Piedra del Cocuy Natural Monument is a natural protected area located in the Río Negro municipality, in the state of Amazonas, Venezuela. It received the status of natural monument by decree No. 2,986 dated December 12, 1978, published in Official Gazette 2.417-E dated March 7, 1979. 

It is located less than two miles east of the Rio Negro near the Brazilian and Colombian borders.

Due to its harsh terrain, vegetation is relatively sparse though characterized by its endemism. Vegetation abounds in the surrounding tropical forest.

See also
List of national parks of Venezuela
Natural Monument

References

Piedra
Protected areas established in 1978